Sixteen ships of the Royal Navy have been named HMS Mermaid after the mermaid:

 was a galley captured in 1545 and listed until 1563.
 was a 24-gun ship launched in 1651, rebuilt as a 32-gun fifth rate in 1689, rebuilt again in 1707 and broken up in 1734.
 was an 8-gun fireship captured in 1692 and burnt by accident in 1693.
HMS Mermaid was to have been a 24-gun sixth rate. She was renamed  in 1735 and launched in 1736.
She was renamed HMS Mermaid in 1744 and was sold in 1748.
 was a 24-gun sixth-rate frigate launched in 1749 and wrecked in 1760.
 was a 28-gun sixth-rate frigate launched in 1761 and wrecked during combat in 1778.
 was a 32-gun fifth-rate frigate launched in 1784 and broken up in 1815.
 was a 1-gun gunvessel purchased in 1798 and sold in 1800. 
 was a cutter built at Howrah in 1816, purchased by the Australian Government in 1817 for use as a survey vessel. Wrecked off Cairns in 1829.
 was a 46-gun fifth-rate frigate launched in 1825, used as a powder hulk from 1850, lent to the war department in 1863 and broken up by 1875.
 was a coastguard vessel purchased in 1853 and sold in 1890.
 was a  launched in 1898 and sold in 1919.
 was a modified Black Swan-class sloop launched in 1943. She was transferred to the German Navy in 1959 and renamed Scharnhorst, was hulked for damage control training between 1974 and 1989, and was towed to be broken up in 1990.
She was renamed HMS Mermaid on her conversion to a survey vessel in 1965. She was sold in 1970.
  was a frigate, built for the Ghana Navy as Black Star but cancelled, launched in 1966 but unused until purchased by the Royal Navy in 1972.

Battle honours
Ships named Mermaid have earned the following battle honours:
Cadiz 1596
Dover 1652
Gabbard 1653
Scheveningen 1653
Porto Farina 1655
Lowestoft 1665
Belgian Coast 1914–17
Arctic 1944

See also
 is a  survey motor launch of the Royal Australian Navy, launched in 1989 and currently in service.
His Majesty's hired armed vessel Mermaid, which was present at the Vlieter Incident in August 1799.

References

Royal Navy ship names